Zygmunt Heljasz (21 September 1908 – 12 June 1963) was a Polish athlete. He competed at the 1932 Summer Olympics in the shot put and discus throw and finished in 7th and 13th place, respectively. He also placed 7th in the shot put at the 1934 European Athletics Championships. Heljasz was a multiple national champion in the shot put, discus throw and hammer throw.

Heljasz first trained in boxing and finished second at the national heavyweight championships. He changed to athletics in 1926, and already in 1927 was included into the national team. He competed at the 1928 Olympics, but in 1936, due to a conflict with the Polish Athletic Federation was excluded from the Olympic team and banned from competitions for one year. He turned to coaching, first in Brussels, Belgium, and then in Katowice. During World War II he was imprisoned in the Sachsenhausen and Gross-Rosen concentration camps. After the war he continued coaching athletics in Szczecin.

References

1908 births
1963 deaths
Polish male shot putters
Polish male discus throwers
Olympic athletes of Poland
Athletes (track and field) at the 1932 Summer Olympics
Sportspeople from Poznań
Gross-Rosen concentration camp survivors
Sachsenhausen concentration camp survivors